Erith and Crayford was a constituency which returned one Member of Parliament (MP)  to the House of Commons of the UK's Parliament.

It was created for the 1955 general election, and abolished for the 1997 general election, when it was replaced by the new constituencies of Erith & Thamesmead and Bexleyheath & Crayford.

For its final 32 years it was in the London Borough of Bexley, south-east London but for its first ten years instead in Kent, divided among two council districts, below the higher tier of Kent County Council.

History

Boundaries

1955–1974: The Municipal Borough of Erith, and the Urban District of Crayford.

1974–1983: The London Borough of Bexley wards of Belvedere, Bostall, Crayford North, Crayford Town, Crayford West, Erith Town, and Northumberland Heath.

1983–1997: The London Borough of Bexley wards of Belvedere, Bostall, Crayford, Erith, North End, Northumberland Heath, and Thamesmead East.

Members of Parliament

Elections

Elections in the 1950s

Elections in the 1960s

Elections in the 1970s

Elections in the 1980s

Elections in the 1990s

References

Parliamentary constituencies in London (historic)
Constituencies of the Parliament of the United Kingdom established in 1955
Constituencies of the Parliament of the United Kingdom disestablished in 1997
Politics of the London Borough of Bexley